

Alfred Müller (23 November 1915 – 2 July 1997) was a general in the Bundeswehr of West Germany. During World War II, he served as an officer in the Wehrmacht and was a recipient of the Knight's Cross of the Iron Cross with Oak Leaves of Nazi Germany.

Awards and decorations
 Iron Cross (1939) 2nd Class (11 October 1939) & 1st Class (25 July 1941)
 Knight's Cross of the Iron Cross with Oak Leaves
 Knight's Cross on 20 February 1943 as Hauptmann and commander of Sturmgeschütz-Lehr-Batterie 901
 Oak Leaves on 15 December 1943 as Hauptmann and commander of Sturmgeschütz-Abteilung 191
 Order of Merit of the Federal Republic of Germany (22 February 1973)

References

Citations

Bibliography

 
 

1915 births
1997 deaths
People from Schmalkalden-Meiningen
Military personnel from Thuringia
Recipients of the Knight's Cross of the Iron Cross with Oak Leaves
German prisoners of war in World War II held by the United States
Officers Crosses of the Order of Merit of the Federal Republic of Germany
Brigadier generals of the German Army
German Army officers of World War II